Caroline and the Rebels  is a 1955 French historical adventure film directed by Jean Devaivre and starring Jean-Claude Pascal, Sophie Desmarets and Brigitte Bardot. It is loosely part of the Caroline chérie film series, although the character never actually appears and is seen only in a miniature.

It was shot at the Saint-Maurice Studios in Paris and on location in Roussillon. The film's sets were designed by the art director Jacques Krauss.

The film recorded 1,667,829 admissions in France.

Cast
 Jean-Claude Pascal as Juan d'Aranda/de Sallanches
 Sophie Desmarets as Duchess Laure d'Albuquerque
 Brigitte Bardot as Pilar d'Aranda
 Jacques Dacqmine as General Gaston de Sallanche
 Magali Noël as Térésa
 Georges Descrières as Lt. Tinteville
 Alfred Adam as General Lasalle
 Micheline Gary as Conchita d'Aranda
 Germaine Dermoz as Comtesse d'Aranda
 Daniel Ceccaldi as Lt. Bogard
 Robert Dalban as Le capitaine des gendarmes
 Jean Debucourt as Le père supérieur
 Charles Dechamps as L'oncle de Juan
 Albert Dinan as Lt. Guéneau
 Jean Galland as Marquis de Villa-Campo
 Bernard Lajarrige as Lavaux 
 Robert Manuel as King Joseph 
 Marcel Pérès (actor) as Frégos les Papillottes  
 Pascale Roberts as Sallanches's friend
 Michel Etcheverry as Priest
 Marcel Bozzuffi as Soldier
 Bernard Musson as L'homme aux fèves

References

Bibliography
 Hayward, Susan. French Costume Drama of the 1950s: Fashioning Politics in Film. Intellect Books, 2010.
 Rège, Philippe. Encyclopedia of French Film Directors, Volume 1. Scarecrow Press, 2009.

External links
 

Napoleonic Wars films
Films set in the 1810s
Films set in Spain
1955 films
1950s French-language films
Films directed by Jean Devaivre
1950s historical adventure films
French historical adventure films
Gaumont Film Company films
Films based on works by Jacques Laurent
1950s French films